Hugh Herbert (August 10, 1885 – March 12, 1952) was an American motion picture comedian. He began his career in vaudeville and wrote more than 150 plays and sketches.

Career
Born in Binghamton, New York, Herbert attended Cornell University. As an actor, he "had many serious roles, and for years was seen on major vaudeville circuits as a pathetic old Hebrew."

The advent of talking pictures brought stage-trained actors to Hollywood, and Herbert soon became a popular movie comedian. His screen character was usually flustered and absent-minded. He would flutter his fingers together and talk to himself, repeating the same phrases: "Hoo-hoo-hoo, wonderful, wonderful, hoo hoo hoo!" So many imitators (including Curly Howard of The Three Stooges, Mickey Rooney as Andy Hardy and Etta Candy in the Wonder Woman comic book series) copied the catchphrase as "woo woo" that Herbert himself began to use "woo woo" rather than "hoo hoo" in the 1940s.

Herbert's earliest movies, like Wheeler & Woolsey's feature Hook, Line and Sinker (1930), cast him in generic comedy roles that could have been taken by any comedian. He developed his own unique screen personality, complete with a silly giggle, and this new character caught on quickly. He was frequently featured in Warner Brothers films of the 1930s, including Bureau of Missing Persons, Footlight Parade (both 1933), Dames, Fog Over Frisco, Fashions of 1934 (all 1934), and Gold Diggers of 1935 (1935), as well as A Midsummer Night's Dream (also 1935), a film adaptation of  Shakespeare's play. He played leads in "B comedies", notably Sh! The Octopus (1937), a comedy-mystery featuring an exceptional unmasking of the culprit.

Herbert was often caricatured in Warners' Looney Tunes shorts of the 1930s/40s, such as Speaking of the Weather (1937) and The Hardship of Miles Standish (1940). One of the minor characters in the Terrytoons short The Talking Magpies (1946) is also a recognizably Herbertesque bird. In 1939, Herbert signed with Universal Pictures, where, as at Warners, he played supporting roles in major films and leading roles in minor ones. One of his best-received performances from this period is in the Olsen and Johnson comedy Hellzapoppin' (1941), in which he played a nutty detective.

Herbert joined Columbia Pictures in 1943 and became a familiar face in short subjects, with the same actors and directors who made the Stooges shorts. He continued to star in these comedies for the remainder of his life.

Herbert wrote six screenplays, co-wrote the screenplays for the films Lights of New York (1928) and Second Wife (1930), and contributed to The Great Gabbo (1929) and others. He acted in three films co-written by the much more prolific (but unrelated) screenwriter F. Hugh Herbert: Fashions of 1934 (1934), We're in the Money (1935) and Colleen (1936). He also directed one film, He Knew Women (1930).

Recognition
Herbert has a star at 6251 Hollywood Boulevard on the Hollywood Walk of Fame. It was dedicated February 8, 1960.

Personal life and death
Herbert was married to Rose Epstein, who was also known by the name Anita Pam.

Herbert died on March 12, 1952, at age 66 from cardiovascular disease in North Hollywood, Los Angeles.

Brother
Hugh's brother, Tom Herbert, was a screen comedian who played mildly flustered roles. He is featured in the Warner Brothers short subject Double or Nothing (1940) as his brother Hugh's movie double.

Selected filmography

Husbands for Rent (1927) .... Valet
Caught in the Fog (1928) .... Detective Riley
Mind Your Business (1928, Short)
Danger Lights (1930) .... Professor - the Hobo
Hook, Line and Sinker (1930) .... Hotel House Detective
She Went for a Tramp (1931, Short)
Laugh and Get Rich (1931) .... Joe Austin
The Sin Ship (1931) .... Charlie
Traveling Husbands (1931) .... Hymie Schwartz
Friends and Lovers (1931) .... McNellis
The Lost Squadron (1932) .... Fritz
Million Dollar Legs (1932) .... Secretary of the Treasury
Faithless (1932) .... Mr. Peter M. Blainey
Sham Poo, the Magician (1932, Short) .... Sham Poo
Strictly Personal (1933) .... Wetzel
Diplomaniacs (1933) .... Chinaman
She Had to Say Yes (1933) .... Luther Haines
Goodbye Again (1933) .... Harvey Wilson
Bureau of Missing Persons (1933) .... Hank Slade
Footlight Parade (1933) .... Bowers
Tis Spring (1933, Short)
College Coach (1933) .... J- Marvin Barnett
From Headquarters (1933) .... Manny Wales
Convention City (1933) .... Hotstetter
Easy to Love (1934) .... Detective
Fashions of 1934 (1934) .... Joe Ward
Wonder Bar (1934) .... Pratt
Harold Teen (1934) .... Ed Rathburn
Merry Wives of Reno (1934) .... Colonel Fitch
The Merry Frinks (1934) .... Joe 'Poppa' Frink
Fog Over Frisco (1934) .... Izzy Wright
Dames (1934) .... Ezra Ounce
Kansas City Princess (1934) .... Junior Ashcraft
Good Badminton (1935, Short) .... Hugh
Sweet Adeline (1935) .... Rupert Rockingham
Gold Diggers of 1935 (1935) .... T. Mosley Thorpe
Traveling Saleslady (1935) .... Elmer
We're in the Money (1935) .... Lawyer Homer Bronson
A Midsummer Night's Dream (1935) .... Snout - the Tinker
To Beat the Band (1935) .... Hugo Twist / Elizabeth Twist
Miss Pacific Fleet (1935) .... Mr. J. August Freytag
Colleen (1936) .... Cedric Ames
One Rainy Afternoon (1936) .... Toto
We Went to College (1936) .... Professor Standish
Love Begins at Twenty (1936) .... Horatio Gillingwater
Sing Me a Love Song (1936) .... Siegfried Hammerschlag
Top of the Town (1937) .... Hubert
That Man's Here Again (1937) .... Thomas J. Jesse
A Day at Santa Anita (1937, Short) .... Himself (uncredited)
The Singing Marine (1937) .... Aeneas Phinney / Clarissa
Marry the Girl (1937) .... John B. Radway
The Perfect Specimen (1937) .... Killigrew Shaw
Sh! The Octopus (1937) .... Kelly
Hollywood Hotel (1937) .... Chester Marshall
Gold Diggers in Paris (1938) .... Maurice Giraud
Men Are Such Fools (1938) .... Harvey Bates
Four's a Crowd (1938) .... Jenkins
The Great Waltz (1938) .... Hofbauer
The Family Next Door (1939) .... George Pierce
The Lady's from Kentucky (1939) .... Mousey Johnson
Eternally Yours (1939) .... Benton
Little Accident (1939) .... Herbert Pearson
La Conga Nights (1940) .... Henry I. Dibble Jr. / Faith Dibble / Hope Dibble / Charity Dibble / Prudence Dibble / Mrs. Henry I. Dibble Jr. / Henry I. Dibble Sr.
Private Affairs (1940) .... Angus McPherson
A Little Bit of Heaven (1940) .... Pop Loring
The Villain Still Pursued Her (1940) .... Frederick Healy
Hit Parade of 1941 (1940) .... Ferdinand Farraday
Slightly Tempted (1940) .... Professor Ross
Meet the Chump (1941) .... Hugh Mansfield
The Black Cat (1941) .... Mr. Penny
Hello, Sucker (1941) .... Hubert Worthington Clippe
Badlands of Dakota (1941) .... Rocky Plummer
Hellzapoppin' (1941) .... Quimby
Don't Get Personal (1942) .... Elmer Whippet / Oscar Whippet
You're Telling Me (1942) .... Hubert Abercrombie Gumm
There's One Born Every Minute (1942) .... Lemuel P. Twine / Abner Twine / Colonel Cladius Zebediah Twine
Mrs. Wiggs of the Cabbage Patch (1942) .... Marcus Throckmorton
It's a Great Life (1943) .... Timothy Brewster
Stage Door Canteen (1943) .... Himself
Pitchin' in the Kitchen (1943, Short) .... Adam Spiggott
Who's Hugh? (1943, Short) .... Himself
Oh, Baby! (1944, Short) .... Elmer 'Picklepuss' Burns
His Hotel Sweet (1944, Short) .... Himself
Kismet (1944) .... Feisal
Ever Since Venus (1944) .... P.G. Grimble
A Knight and a Blonde (1944, Short) .... Himself
Music for Millions (1944) .... Uncle Ferdinand
Woo, Woo! (1945, Short)
Wife Decoy (1945, Short) .... Hughie Hawkins
The Mayor's Husband (1945, Short) .... Himself
One Way to Love (1946) .... Eustace P. Trumble
When the Wife's Away (1946, Short) .... Himself
Get Along Little Zombie (1946, Short) .... Himself
Honeymoon Blues (1946, Short) .... Himself
Hot Heir (1947, Short) .... Himself
Nervous Shakedown (1947, Short) .... Mr. Penn
Blondie in the Dough (1947) .... Llewellyn Simmons
Should Husbands Marry? (1947, Short) .... Himself
On Our Merry Way (1948) .... Eli Hobbs
Tall, Dark and Gruesome (1948, Short) .... Hugh Sherlock, playwright
So This Is New York (1948) .... Mr. Lucius Trumball
One Touch of Venus (1948) .... Mercury (scenes deleted)
The Girl from Manhattan (1948) .... Aaron Goss
A Song Is Born (1948) .... Professor Twingle
A Pinch in Time (1948, Short) .... Himself
Trapped by a Blonde (1949, Short) .... Himself
The Beautiful Blonde from Bashful Bend (1949) .... Doctor
Super Wolf (1949, Short) .... Aunt Fanny / Dave McGurk alias Dave the Drip
One Shivery Night (1950, Short) .... Himself
A Slip and a Miss (1950, Short) .... Himself
Woo-Woo Blues (1951, Short) .... Himself
Havana Rose (1951) .... Filbert Fillmore
Trouble In-Laws (1951, Short) .... Himself
The Gink in the Sink (1952, Short) .... Himself (final film role)

As writer
Sunny California (1928, Short)
Lights of New York (1928)
Mind Your Business (1928, Short)
The Great Gabbo (1930)
The Second Wife (1930)
He Knew Women (1930)
The Sin Ship (1931)

As director
He Knew Women (1930)

References

Further reading
 Anthony, Walter (February 4, 1912). "The Melting Pot in vaudeville". The San Francisco Call. p. 47
 "Hugh Herbert, Who Plays Aged Jew, Is Scotchman and Only 29; Actor at Orpheum Finds Hebrew Character Most Effective on Modern Stage". The Des Moines Register. April 23, 1915. p. 5

External links

1885 births
1952 deaths
Male actors from New York City
American male film actors
American male screenwriters
Vaudeville performers
Actors from Binghamton, New York
20th-century American male actors
Screenwriters from New York (state)
20th-century American male writers
20th-century American screenwriters
Columbia Pictures contract players
Cornell University alumni
American people of Scottish descent